Cyperus tatandaensis is a species of sedge that is native to parts of Africa.

See also 
 List of Cyperus species

References 

tatandaensis
Plants described in 2004
Flora of Tanzania